Centronia mutisii is a species of plant in the family Melastomataceae. It is endemic to Colombia.

References

mutisii
Vulnerable plants
Endemic flora of Colombia
Taxa named by Aimé Bonpland
Taxonomy articles created by Polbot